The Kenya national cricket team toured the Netherlands in 2008. They played one first class match and one One Day International against the Netherlands.

Intercontinental Cup Match

Only ODI

Kenyan cricket tours abroad